Graduate School of Arts and Sciences may refer to:
 Boston College Graduate School of Arts & Sciences
 Brandeis University Graduate School of Arts and Sciences
 College of William & Mary Graduate School of Arts and Sciences
 Columbia Graduate School of Arts and Sciences
 Fordham Graduate School of Arts and Sciences
 Georgetown University Graduate School of Arts and Sciences
 Harvard Graduate School of Arts and Sciences
 New York University Graduate School of Arts and Science
 Yale Graduate School of Arts and Sciences